The Pitchfork Music Festival 2006 was held over two days on July 29 to 30, 2006 at the Union Park, Chicago, United States. The edition marks the first edition under the current name, after the publication curated the lineup for Intonation Music Festival the previous year.

Lineup
Artists listed from latest to earliest set times.

References

External links

Pitchfork Music Festival
2006 music festivals